Dangerous Attraction is the debut album released by heavy metal band Lion.

The original album was released in Japan as an import. A remastered edition was released in 2017 and included "The Transformers (Theme)" single as a bonus track.

Track listing

Personnel 
Lion
 Kal Swan – vocals, acoustic guitar 
 Doug Aldrich – guitars, backing vocals 
 Jerry Best – bass, backing vocals 
 Mark Edwards – drums, backing vocals

Additional musicians
 Pat Regan – keyboards 
 Gary Falcone – additional backing vocals
 Scott MacLachlan – additional backing vocals
 Vicki Seeger – additional backing vocals

Production 
 Lion – producers
 Bill Freesh – engineer
 Jamey Dell – assistant engineer
 Jim Isaacs – production coordination
 Julia Melanie Goode – creative direction 
 Kal Swan – logo design 
 Andy Rosen – photography 
 Glen La Ferman – back cover photography 
 Bill Silby – lettering

References

1987 debut albums
Lion (band) albums
Scotti Brothers Records albums